Smock may refer to one of the following:
 Smock-frock, a coatlike outer garment, often worn to protect the clothes
 Smocking, an embroidery technique in which the fabric is gathered, then embroidered with decorative stitches to hold the gathers in place
 Chemise, a woman's undergarment
 A smock mill, a windmill with a wooden tower, resembling the garment in appearance
 A Ghanaian smock, a shirt worn in Ghana